Aeschynite-(Nd) is a rare earth mineral of neodymium, cerium, calcium, thorium, titanium, niobium, oxygen, and hydrogen with the chemical formula .  Its name comes from the Greek word for "shame".  Its Mohs scale rating is 5 to 6. It is a member of the hydroxide minerals.

It was first reported for an occurrence in Bayan Obo, Inner Mongolia in 1982. In that rare earth mining deposit it occurs in veins within metamorphosed dolomite and slate. It occurs associated with aegirine, riebeckite, barite, fluorite, albite, phlogopite and magnetite. The IMA symbol is Aes-Nd.

See also
 List of minerals

References

Mindat.org
Webmineral.org

Calcium minerals
Hydroxide minerals
Orthorhombic minerals
Minerals in space group 62